
Robert Grant may refer to:

Politicians
Robert Grant (British Columbia politician) (1854–1935), lumberman and politician in British Columbia, Canada
Robert Grant (Kansas politician) (1948–2015)
Sir Robert Grant (MP) (1779–1838), British politician and lawyer, hymn-writer and essayist 
Robert A. Grant (1905–1998), U.S. Representative from Indiana
Robert E. Grant (politician) (1825-1888), American politician
Robert Henry Grant (1860–1930), politician from Ontario, Canada
Robert Mills Grant (1926–2012), Republican member of the Wyoming House of Representatives
Robert Patterson Grant (1814–1892), Scottish-born merchant and political figure in Nova Scotia, Canada
Robert Y. Grant (1819–1862), New York politician

Sportspeople
Robert Grant (cricketer) (born 1965), English former cricketer
Robert Grant (English footballer) (born 1990), English footballer
Robert Grant (Scottish footballer), Scottish footballer
Robert Grant (athlete) (born 1996), born-American Italian athlete

Others
Robert Grant (VC) (1837–1874), Victoria Cross recipient
Ramesvara Swami, born Robert Grant, ISKCON member
Robert Grant (astronomer) (1814–1892), Scottish astronomer
Robert Grant (Christian leader) (born 1936), radio personality, pastor
Robert Grant (novelist) (1852–1940), American novelist and Boston judge
Robert Edmond Grant (1793–1874), British zoologist, held Chair of Comparative Anatomy at University College London
Robert J. Grant (1862–1950), director of the U.S. Mint
Robert M. Grant (theologian) (1917–2014), American theologian and church historian
Robert M. Grant (economist) (born 1948), American economic strategist
Rob Grant, British comedy writer and television producer

See also 
Bob Grant (disambiguation)